Michael Baer (born 31 March 1987), is a Welsh cricketer. Baer is a left-handed batsman who bowls slow left-arm orthodox. He was born in Rhuddlan, Flintshire and educated at Lancaster Royal Grammar School in Lancashire.

Baer made his first-class debut for Loughborough UCCE against Worcestershire in 2008 at the Chester Road North Ground, Kidderminster. He played a further three first-class fixtures in 2009, the last of which came against Hampshire. In his four first-class matches, he scored 12 runs at a batting average of 12.00, with high score of 8. With the ball he took 3 wickets at an expensive bowling average of 110.00. His best bowling figures of 2/19 came against Leicestershire in 2009 and included the wickets of Wayne White and Nathan Buck. His other first-class wicket came against Hampshire and was that of James Vince.

Baer joined Cumberland in 2008, making his Minor Counties Championship debut against Hertfordshire. He made two further appearances in 2010 against Norfolk and Lincolnshire. He has played Second XI cricket for both the Lancashire Second XI and Middlesex Second XI.

References

External links
Michael Baer at ESPNcricinfo
Michael Baer at CricketArchive

1987 births
Living people
People from Rhuddlan
Sportspeople from Denbighshire
People educated at Lancaster Royal Grammar School
Welsh cricketers
Loughborough MCCU cricketers
Cumberland cricketers